Marian McPartland's Piano Jazz with Steely Dan is a jazz album released in 2005. The album consists of songs and conversations recorded during a 2002 visit by the jazz-rock band Steely Dan to Piano Jazz, a radio program hosted by Marian McPartland. Steely Dan are backed by a jazz trio that includes McPartland on the piano. This album is one of a number of albums released of recordings from the Piano Jazz show.

Track listing
"Conversation" – 1:38
"Limbo Jazz" (Duke Ellington) – 2:42
"Conversation" – 5:07
"Josie" (Walter Becker, Donald Fagen) – 3:50
"Conversation" – 3:06
"Mood Indigo" (Barney Bigard, Duke Ellington, Irving Mills) – 3:07
"Conversation" – 2:41
"Star Eyes" (Gene de Paul, Don Raye) – 3:19
"Conversation" – 3:38
"Hesitation Blues" (W.C. Handy) – 3:26
"Conversation" – 5:17
"Things Ain't What They Used to Be" (Mercer Ellington, Persons) – 3:46
"Conversation" – 1:41
"Chain Lightning" (Becker, Fagen) – 4:44
"Conversation" – 1:50
"Black Friday" (Becker, Fagen) – 3:50

References

Marian McPartland albums
Collaborative albums
2005 live albums
Steely Dan live albums
Concord Records live albums